James Worpel (born 24 January 1999) is a professional Australian rules footballer playing for the Hawthorn Football Club in the Australian Football League (AFL).

Early career
One of nine siblings growing up in the regional town of Bannockburn near Geelong, James was the second youngest and grew up with three other football obsessed brothers. An early developer James was selected at centre half back in the 2014 U/15 All Australian team. He also attended school at Western Heights College located in Geelong

Worpel spent two years developing his craft in the TAC with the Geelong Falcons. Worpel is a fierce competitor that goes in to win hard ball.

A natural leader he was appointed co-captain of the Falcons for the 2017 year. He would later lead the side to the premiership. He was captain of the Victoria Country team in the 2017 AFL Under 18 Championships and was later rewarded with being selected in the U/18 All-Australian team.

AFL career
Worpel was drafted by Hawthorn with their first selection and forty-fifth overall in the 2017 AFL draft. He made his AFL debut in the thirty-five point win against  at the University of Tasmania Stadium in round six of the 2018 season. He played three games before getting dropped. Back in the side for round 18 against , he put in an impressive four match performance for Worpel became Hawthorn’s second Rising Star nominee for the 2018 season.

2019 season

Worpel wore number 38 for his debut season.

Worpel was picked for round one, and managed to play every game for the season. He set a league record for most disposals for a player under twenty years of age. Ultimately he was voted the best player for Hawthorn for the season, collecting the Peter Crimmins Medal, becoming the youngest winner of that record since Leigh Matthews won it in 1971. Worpel is considered a protégé of Senior Coach and former Hawthorn player Sam Mitchell.

In 2020 Worpel missed the last two games of the season when he injured of his right acromioclavicular (AC) joint against  that required surgery to stabilise the joint.

Statistics 
Updated to the end of 2022.

|-
| 2018 ||  || 38
| 11 || 5 || 5 || 95 || 98 || 193 || 23 || 43 || 0.5 || 0.5 || 8.6 || 8.9 || 17.5 || 2.1 || 3.9 || 0
|-
| 2019 ||  || 5
| 22 || 9 || 8 || 309 || 275 || 584 || 72 || 107 || 0.4 || 0.4 || 14.0 || 12.5 || 26.5 || 3.3 || 4.9 || 10
|-
| 2020 ||  || 5
| 15 || 2 || 7 || 167 || 120 || 287 || 39 || 81 || 0.1 || 0.5 || 11.1 || 8.0 || 19.1 || 2.6 || 5.4 || 0
|-
| 2021 ||  || 5
| 20 || 10 || 8 || 232 || 194 || 426 || 54 || 82 || 0.5 || 0.4 || 11.6 || 9.7 || 21.3 || 2.7 || 4.1 || 0
|-
| 2022 ||  || 5
| 11 || 3 || 2 || 86 || 83 || 169 || 20 || 24 || 0.3 || 0.2 || 7.8 || 7.5 || 15.4 || 1.8 || 2.2 || 0
|- class="sortbottom"
! colspan=3| Career
! 79 !! 29 !! 30 !! 889 !! 770 !! 1659 !! 208 !! 337 !! 0.4 !! 0.4 !! 11.3 !! 9.7 !! 21.0 !! 2.6 !! 4.3 || 10
|}

Notes

Honours and achievements
Team
 TAC Cup premiership (Geelong Falcons): 2017

Individual
 Peter Crimmins Medal: 2019
 22 Under 22 team: 2019
  best first year player (debut season): 2018
 AFL Rising Star nominee: 2018
 TAC Cup premiership captain: 2017
 Under 18 All-Australian team: 2017

References

External links

1999 births
Living people
Geelong Falcons players
Box Hill Football Club players
Hawthorn Football Club players
Peter Crimmins Medal winners
Australian rules footballers from Victoria (Australia)